Cameron Zurhaar (born 22 May 1998) is a professional Australian rules footballer playing for the North Melbourne Football Club in the Australian Football League (AFL).

AFL career

He was drafted by North Melbourne with their first selection and eleventh overall in the 2017 rookie draft.

In a Round 7 win over Carlton in 2019, Zurhaar kicked a game-high 5 goals en route to winning the Round 7 Rising Star nomination. His nickname amongst the North Melbourne supporter base is the 'Bull', in response to his ferocious attack on the football.

He kicked his 100th AFL goal in the same match.

His surname is of Dutch origin.

References

External links

1998 births
Living people
North Melbourne Football Club players
East Fremantle Football Club players
Australian rules footballers from Western Australia
Australian people of Dutch descent